Brigantine Castle was a popular funhouse and haunted house attraction by the beach in Brigantine, New Jersey. It was originally located at the corner of 14th Street and Brigantine Avenue.

Constructed in 1976, it drew millions of visitors annually until it was damaged in 1982 in a storm. Facing declining attendance and a $500,000 repair bill, it was closed in 1984. Carmen Ricci, the owner, sold it in 1987 for $1 million, and it burned to the ground later that year just as demolition was slated to begin.

References
http://www.nytimes.com/1984/05/20/nyregion/haunted-houses-inspected.html
http://www.courierpostonline.com/story/news/local/south-jersey/2017/10/29/brigantine-castle-workers-reflect-spooky-memories/811518001/
http://www.thedailyjournal.com/story/news/history/2015/05/22/local-history-do-you-remember-brigantine-castle/27776843/

External links
 Brigantine Castle Online

Defunct amusement parks in New Jersey
Tourist attractions in Atlantic County, New Jersey
Brigantine, New Jersey
1976 establishments in New Jersey
1984 disestablishments in New Jersey
Amusement parks opened in 1976
Amusement parks closed in 1984